Trix may refer to:

Brands and products 
 Trix (cereal), a breakfast cereal  made by General Mills
 Trix yogurt, branded Yoplait yogurt
 Trix (company), the German company that produced Trix construction and model train sets
 Trix (toyline), originally produced in Germany and later in the UK
 Kodak Tri-X, a popular brand of black-and-white photographic film from Kodak
 Google Trix, internal codename for Google Sheets component of Google Docs

Science and technology 
 Trix (dinosaur), a Tyrannosaurus rex specimen
 TRIX (operating system), start for the first attempt at the GNU kernel
 Trix (technical analysis), triple exponential, a technical analysis oscillator
 TriX (serialization format), Triples in XML, a serialization of Resource Description Framework models

Entertainment and the arts 
 Trix & Flix, the two official mascots for UEFA Euro 2008
 Trix Gilmore, a recurring character on the TV series Gilmore Girls
 Trix MacMillan, a fictional character in the "Eighth Doctor Adventures" novels based upon the Doctor Who television series
 Trix Records, a blues record label
 Trix (Trillizas de oro) (born 1960), pop group of blonde identical triplet women
 The Trix (Winx Club), a group of antagonists in the fictional series Winx Club

People 
 Helen Trix (1886–1951), American actress, dancer, singer, and song composer
 Trix Worrell (born 1959), St Lucia-born writer, composer, and director
 Trix Rechner, Swiss high jumper
 Trix Heberlein (born 1942), Swiss politician
  (born 1939), South African rugby union player
 Trix, one half of the British Asian rap duo Metz N Trix

See also 
 Trick (disambiguation)